Keith Leopold (30 July 1920 - 1999) was an Australian author of English, French and German language adventure novels for children and young adults, and German Language Reference books. He was born in East Maitland, New South Wales in 1920 and died in 1999.

Biography

Early life 

Leopold completed a German Honours course at the New England University College of the University of Sydney in 1942. The campus would later become the University of New England, effectively making him an alumnus of both universities. 

He went on to serve in Australian Special Intelligence and later joined the Department of External Affairs.

In 1946 he joined the German Department of the University of Sydney as academic staff, and in 1947 became head of German at Queensland University.

He travelled extensively in Europe, especially Germany and spent time living there. In 1973 he was awarded the Distinguished Service Cross of the Order of Merit of the Federal Republic of Germany for his services to the study of German in Australia.

Bibliography

The time levels in Thomas Mann's Joseph the Provider (Published 1958)
Meyer and M'erim'ee (1960) Queensland University Press
Ricards Huch's Der letate Sommer : an example of epistolary fiction in the twentieth century (1962) Queensland University Press
Ein Abenteuer in Deutschland; illustrated by H.E. Oiderman (1963) Angus & Robertson
Introducing German (1964) Angus & Robertson
Germany and the European novel : inaugural lecture delivered at the University of Queensland, 27 April 1965 (1966) Queensland University Press
Andreas Gryphius and the Sieur de Saint-Lazare : a study of the tragedy Catharina von Georgien in relation to its French source (1967) Queensland University Press
Nora aus der Fremde; Illustrated by Julie Mattox (1968) Angus & Robertson
Introducing German (1969) Angus & Robertson
Deutsche Teenager von heute : one hundred German passages for reading, comprehension and translation (1969) Angus & Robertson
My Brow is Wet (1969) Angus & Robertson
Key to 'Introducing German' (1972) McGraw Hill
Die vier Kidnapper (1977) McGraw Hill
Holly et les Terroristes
When We Ran; Illustrated by Eva Wickenberg (1981) Rigby
Fleur (1993)  Eldorado
Came to Booloominbah : a country scholar's progress, 1938–1942; edited and with an introduction by J.S. Ryan (1998) University of New England Press

Film adaptations

In 1986, the novel When We Ran was adapted as a screenplay by Graham Hartley for the film Run Chrissie Run!, directed by Chris Langman and starring Carmen Duncan and Red Symons.

Awards

In 1985 When We Ran won the Avis Page award  from WAYBRA, the West Australian Young Readers Book Award for Highest ranked Australian book on the older readers' list.

References

External links
 

1920 births
1999 deaths
Australian children's writers
Recipients of the Order of Merit of the Federal Republic of Germany
Australian expatriates in Germany
German-language writers
French-language writers